Ryan Pierce may refer to:
 Ryan Pierce (The West Wing), a character on The West Wing
 Ryan Pierce (soccer) (born 1983), American soccer player